The 2009 Dubai World Cup was a horse race held at Nad Al Sheba Racecourse on Saturday 28 March 2009. It was the 14th running of the Dubai World Cup. It was the last edition of the Dubai World Cup to be run on dirt at Nad Al Sheba before being switched to the synthetic Tapeta surface at Meydan Racecourse.

The winner was WinStar Farm's Well Armed, a six-year-old bay gelding trained in the United States by Eoin Harty and ridden by Aaron Gryder. Well Armed's victory was the first in the race for his jockey, trainer and owner.

Well Armed had been trained in England by Clive Brittain in the early part of his career before being transferred to the Harty's American stable in 2007. Racing in California, he showed his best form on synthetic tracks winning the San Antonio Handicap, the San Diego Handicap and the Goodwood Stakes. In the 2008 Dubai World Cup he finished third behind Curlin and Asiatic Boy. In the 2009 Dubai World Cup he started at odds of 10/1 and won by a record margin of fourteen lengths from the French-trained Gloria de Campeao, with the South African-bred, Saudi Arabian-trained runner Paris Perfect four and a half lengths away in third. The 2/1 favourite Asiatic Boy finished twelfth of the fourteen runners.

Race details
 Sponsor: Emirates Airline
 Purse: £4,166,667; First prize: £2,500,000
 Surface: Dirt
 Going: Fast
 Distance: 10 furlongs
 Number of runners: 14
 Winner's time: 2:01.01

Full result

 Abbreviations: nse = nose; nk = neck; shd = head; hd = head; nk = neck

Winner's details
Further details of the winner, Well Armed
 Sex: Gelding
 Foaled: 4 April 2003
 Country: United States
 Sire: Tiznow; Dam: Well Dressed (Notebook)
 Owner: WinStar Farm
 Breeder: WinStar Farm

References

Dubai World Cup
Dubai World Cup
Dubai World Cup
Dubai World Cup